Mahindra Two Wheelers Limited (MTWL) is a group venture owned by Mahindra & Mahindra Limited (M&M), which manufactures scooters and motorcycles. Mahindra Two Wheelers Limited was founded in 2008, when Mahindra & Mahindra Limited acquired the business assets of Kinetic Motor Company Limited. MTWL has partnered with Taiwan's Sanyang Industry Company (SYM) to help develop its scooter portfolio, and with Italy-based Engines Engineering for research and product design. Today Mahindra owns some of the renowned European two wheeler brands like BSA and Peugeot as well.

Facilities
The company has a manufacturing facility at Pithampur, near Indore in Madhya Pradesh.

Mahindra Two Wheelers Limited has a Research and Development unit located at Chinchwad, Pune, equipped with necessary design and development facilities right from renderings to prototype manufacture and testing. It has invested  to make it functional.

The company has a 200 strong vendor network spread across the nation with more than 300 dealers creating 700 touch points.

Current products

Motorcycles 
 Mahindra Mojo 300 ABS

Discontinued

Scooters
Mahindra Flyte
Mahindra Kine
Mahindra Rodeo
Mahindra Rodeo RZ
Mahindra Rodeo UZ
Mahindra Duro
Mahindra Duro DZ
Mahindra Gusto
Mahindra Gusto 125
Mahindra Gusto 110

Motorcycles
Mahindra Pantero
Mahindra Stallio
Mahindra Centuro
Mahindra Centuro XT
 Mahindra Centuro NXT
 Mahindra Centuro Disk Break
 Mahindra Centuro Rockstar
 Mahindra Centuro Rockstar Kick Alloy
Mahindra Mojo
Mahindra Mojo XT
Mahindra Mojo UT

Awards 
 Mahindra Duro was declared the Scooter of the Year at the annual NDTV Car & Bike Awards in 2010.
 Mahindra Rodeo won the Gulf Monsoon Scooter Rally in its first year of participation.
 Mahindra Rodeo won the Best Website Award - Automotive at Campaign India’s Digital Media Awards.
 Mahindra Rodeo RZ won Gulf Dirt Track National Championship.

See also
 
 
 List of electric bicycle brands and manufacturers
 GenZe (company)

References

External links
 Mahindra Two Wheelers Official Website

Mahindra Group
Manufacturing companies based in Pune
Motorcycle manufacturers of India
Indian brands
2008 establishments in Maharashtra
Indian companies established in 2008
Manufacturing companies established in 2008
Companies listed on the Bombay Stock Exchange